Lily Nungarrayi Yirringali Jurrah Hargraves is a Walpiri artist and senior Law woman from Lajamanu, Northern Territory, Australia.
She was also known as Maggie Jurrah/Hargraves. She now prefers to be known as Jurrah but is best known as Lily Hargraves. Her Warlpiri name is Yirringali and Nungarrayi is her skin name.

Life and art 

Nungarrayi is one of the old desert walkers born in the Tanami Desert near Jilla or Chilla Well in 1930. In the 1950s she moved to the settlement of Lajamanu. She began painting on canvas in 1986 after a Traditional Painting Course was held in Lajamanu. Nungarrayi's art is held in a number of major collections, and she has been widely exhibited both in Australia and overseas, including France and the USA. In 2009 Nungarrayi was a finalist in the Telstra National Aboriginal and Torres Strait Islander Art Awards.
In her later years her style has changed slightly showing more freedom and use of colour. Nungarrayi still produces traditional paintings using bold colours on canvas and paint at the Warnayaka Art Gallery in Lajamanu.

As a senior Law woman, she is responsible for supervising women's song and dance ceremonies.

Collections 

AAMU - Museum of Contemporary Aboriginal Art, The Netherlands
Collection Roemer, Germany
Museum and Art Gallery of Northern Territory, Australia
National Gallery of Victoria, Melbourne, Australia
United Nations Office, Darwin, Australia
Peter Boehm Collection, Sydney NSW Australia

References

Further reading 

Crumlin, R.,(ed.),1991, Aboriginal Art & Spirituality, Colins Dove, North Blackburn, Victoria
Glowczewski, B. 1991, Yapa, Peintres Aborigenes de Balgo et Lajamanu
Lebon Gallery, Paris, Johnson, V.,1994
The Dictionary of Western Desert Artists, Craftsman House, East Roseville, NSW., 2004
"Journeylines" M.Stanislawska-Birnberg, J>B>Books Australia., 2000

External links 
Warnayaka Art Gallery

1930 births
2018 deaths
20th-century Australian women artists
20th-century Australian artists
21st-century Australian women artists
21st-century Australian artists
Indigenous Australian artists
Australian painters
Australian women painters
Warlpiri people